George Hambour (1 April 1904 – 25 March 1960) was an Australian politician who represented the South Australian House of Assembly seat of Light from 1956 to 1960 for the Liberal and Country League.

He was also the chairman of the District Council of Eudunda from 1951 to 1957.

References

 

1904 births
1960 deaths
Members of the South Australian House of Assembly
Liberal and Country League politicians
20th-century Australian politicians
Mayors of places in South Australia